The Typhoon-2A is a main battle tank developed and manufactured jointly by the Peruvian company DICSAC (Diseños Casanave Corporation S.A.C. of Peru) and the Kharkiv Morozov Machine Building Design Bureau of Ukraine. The Tifon (Typhoon)-2A is based on the Soviet T-54/55 tank. The tank is a 3-man machine with day and night technology and a thermal vision Buran device with 12 km range.

Development
The Typhoon-2A project was designed by Sergio Casanave Quelopana, a Peruvian Engineer, to help the Peruvian Army keep up with modern tank designs. The design was built around the Peruvian T-55 using feedback from the Peruvian military, and available components in European tank designs. The engineers decided to use the experience of successful modern tank designs, such as the Russian T-90 and the French Leclerc. This was achieved by developing the Typhoon-2A through the Kharkiv Morozov Machine Building Design Bureau. The Typhoon-2A is the product of a series of modifications and modernisations of the T-55 AGM.

Features

Armament
The Typhoon-2A is primarily armed with an auto-loaded 125 mm smooth-bore KBM-1M 48 caliber gun capable of 8 rpm. It can fire APFSDS-T rounds, tandem-charge HEAT rounds, and HE-FRAG rounds with an effective range up to 3,000 m. It also carries  anti-tank guided missile with an effective range exceeding 5,000m, and is capable of targeting ground targets and helicopters flying at low altitude. Secondary armament is a remotely controlled 12.7×108mm KT-12.7 machine gun. The Typhoon-2A may also be fitted with a co-axial 7.62×54mmR KT-7.62 machine gun. Fire control on the Typhoon-2A 2 is a ballistics computer LIO-V operated by both the gunner and the commander. The Typhoon-2A can function at night using BURAN CATHERINE-E thermal vision with a range up to 12 km.

Shielding and defenses
The Typhoon-2A features Ceramic Shield "Deflek T" which is composed of a series of steel compound and polymer plates. T Deflek substantially reduces the initial velocity of APFSDS, and neutralizes HEAT charges fired by both tanks and antitank guns. Nozh Reactive armor is composed of explosive charges, which are activated upon impact over 30 mm projectiles, neutralizing their penetrating effects. The Ceramic Shield "Deflekt" and Reactive Armor "Nozh" can increase overall survivability against Hollow Load missile type (HEAT) rocket antitank missiles or guns and sub-calibrated (APFSDS) 120mm caliber. While operating in the field, it was found effective to "neutralize" the penetration of 120 mm caliber projectile type NATO APFSDS up to 2,000 m, as well as type-120 mm caliber HEAT NATO up to 3,000 m. The system can then ensure that the capacity of ammunition piercing resistance has increased more than 5 times the smoke grenade original. It possesses twelve gauge 81 mm which are located on both sides of the tower, which are actuated by the control box Linkey-SPZ system, creating a smokescreen around the tank.

Mechanics
It has an engine of 1,050 HP 5TDFMA model which is a two stroke, turbocharged and flexible fuel (Kerosene, oil, diesel, jet fuel or a mixture), five-cylinder boxer horizontal type, an ejection system for the ventilation system motor,  and a shutter system that allows the tank to immerse in the water. The 1.8m ventilation liquid type, closed, forced, uses the exhaust gas system of high motor. The purification system efficiency cyclone-type air cassette provides a 99.8% efficiency. The tank can operate for more than 500 km without cleaning the transmission box filter. The planetary system consisting of two plates with six changes forward and three reverse, using a mechanical-electrical-system ensures maximum speed up to 75 km/h at front, and up to 32 km/h backward. The Typhoon-2A has a new type driving system "power steering", presenting data is an indicator of changes in digital display; ignition electric system and pressure. The alternative for removing a suspension and bearing system is newly designed, using 3 rollers per side, torsion bars, and high strength springs, which allow increasing road speed up 60 km/h up to 78 km/h on the road, and greater than 45 km/h in reverse, also counting for this new "Neoprene Pads" to allow a better grip in the road. Can mount a Navigation System (GPS) "TIUS - NM" model based on GLONASS and NAVSTAR system. This system is located in the housing of chief of tank, and given its location with great accuracy as well as that of other vehicles in its strength.

See also

 T-54/55
 T-55AGM

Tanks of comparable role and era
  T-55 Ramses

References

External links 

 TANQUE PRINCIPAL DE COMBATE "TIFON-2A"
 Tanque de batalla T-55 M8 A2 TIFÓN 2

Main battle tanks of Ukraine
Trial and research tanks
Main battle tanks of Peru
Peru–Ukraine relations